Sportscene is the name of a range of Scottish sports television programmes produced by BBC Scotland.

History
Sportscenes predecessors were Sports Special from Scotland and  Sportsreel, which was broadcast every Saturday at around 5pm (results and reports) and 10pm (highlights) in the 1950s, 1960s and the early 1970s. By the mid-1970s, a Sportscene format of a 5pm programme called Scoreboard presented by Gordon Hewitt (as a regional opt-out from Grandstand), plus a 10pm show with highlights from one English and one Scottish league or cup match, was established. Sportscene also covered European and international matches, which usually involved highlights but occasionally live coverage. The show was presented by Archie Macpherson with commentary by Macpherson, Alastair Alexander or Peter Thomson.

Shows

]
There are a number of shows that come under the Sportscene brand.

 Sportscene is broadcast on Saturday and Sunday evenings on BBC Scotland with a late night repeat on BBC One Scotland and is presented by Jonathan Sutherland on Saturdays and Steven Thompson on Sundays. The show produces highlights of all the week's matches from the Scottish Premiership. Sutherland is joined by two studio guests who discuss the results. Guests have included Pat Nevin and Packie Bonner. Commentators include Rob Maclean, Liam McLeod, Paul Mitchell, John Barnes and Alasdair Lamont.
 Sportscene Results is broadcast on Saturday afternoons on BBC One Scotland and occasionally BBC Scotland (formerly BBC Two Scotland). The show rounds up all of the day's main football scores, whilst debating the major Scottish football stories of the week. It sends reporters to every game in the Scottish Premiership, certain games in the Scottish Championship, as well as Scottish Cup and Scottish League Cup games. BBC Scotland had historically produced a Saturday teatime results round-up programme as an opt-out from Grandstand initially known as Scoreboard which launched on 16 August 1975, but in 1989 a new programme called Afternoon Sportscene was launched. It ran for the entire duration of the time allocated for the day's results, starting at some point between 1 and 5 minutes before the network aired English counterpart Final Score. At the start of the 2001/02 season the programme was renamed Sportscene Results to co-inside with the programme and Final Score, becoming programmes in their own right. Sportscene Results is presented by David Currie previous presenters have included Peter Thomson, Sandy McLeish, Murdoch McPherson, Brian Marjoribanks, Alastair Alexander, Gordon Hewitt, Bill McFarlan, Rob Maclean, Jim Craig, Dougie Donnelly, Hazel Irvine, Alison Walker, Dougie Vipond, Stuart Cosgrove and Eilidh Barbour. The show gives football experts like Pat Nevin and Tony Higgins an opportunity to give their views on the days results and the past week of football. 
 Sportscene Live is the name used for all live football matches broadcast by BBC Scotland. It is mostly presented by Steven Thompson and Leanne Crichton on the BBC Scotland channel and some live matches are presented by Rob Maclean on BBC One Scotland. Coverage includes the Scottish Championship, both Scottish cup competitions (the Scottish Cup and the Scottish League Cup) and Scotland matches.
 All other football related programming is simply branded as Sportscene. This includes highlights packages and other one-off specials.

Previous shows

 Sportscene Rugby Special was the title of BBC Scotland's domestic rugby union programming when it held the rights to the Scottish leagues with the live matches & highlights broadcasting on BBC Two Scotland on Sunday teatimes starting on 30 October 1994 until the end of the 1996–97 season also on Sunday lunchtimes for the 1997–98 season for the 1998–99 season it was broadcast on Monday teatimes and for the 1999–2000 season on Sunday nights moving to BBC One Scotland before the 2000–01 season on Saturday nights after Sportscene: Match of the Day although this didn't last long as BBC Scotland lost the broadcasting rights of the Scottish rugby at the end of 2000 to rival Scottish Television which launched Scotsport Rugby Round-Up on 14 January 2001, The last Sportscene Rugby Special programme was on 4 November 2000 (highlights) and 18 November 2000 (live)
 Friday Sportscene was the name of the football preview programme that went out on BBC One Scotland on Friday nights from 11 August 1989 – 25 May 2001 The programme's format was later moved to Saturday lunchtimes in place of Football Focus from 28 July 2001 but has been absent from the schedules since BBC Scotland lost the live rights to the Scottish Premier League in 2004.
 Grandstand from Scotland / Sunday Grandstand from Scotland''' (sometimes branded Scottish Grandstand or Grandstand Scotland) was the name of BBC Scotland's sports programme broadcast as an occasional opt-out from the network version of Grandstand on BBC One Scotland from 1961 - 2006 and BBC Two Scotland from 1989 - 2006. it was initially broadcast as an opt-out from the FA Cup Final throughout the 1960s and 1970s but in subsequent years from 1981 the programme was occasionally broadcast to incorporate local and network sporting events if there was live or highlights coverage of Scottish football, rugby, golf, snooker etc. Presenters have included Peter Thomson, Sandy McLeish, Murdoch McPherson, Brian Marjoribanks, Gordon Hewitt, Dougie Donnelly, Bill McFarlan, Hazel Irvine, Rob Maclean, Jill Douglas, Alison Walker and Dougie Vipond.

Presenters, commentators and reporters
Sportscene's main anchors are David Currie and Jonathan Sutherland. Previous Sportscene presenters include Peter Thomson, Sandy McLeish, Bill Malcolm, Archie Henry, Murdoch McPherson, Brian Marjoribanks, Alastair Alexander, Charles Munro, Archie Macpherson, Gordon Hewitt, Andrew Alexander, Dougie Donnelly, Bill McFarlan, Jim Craig, Derek Johnstone, Laura McGhie, Hazel Irvine, Jock Brown, Mark Souster, Alison Walker, Mike Abbott, Richard Gordon, Jill Douglas, Amy Irons, John Beattie, Dougie Vipond, and Stuart Cosgrove.

The programme's main commentary and reporting team consists of; lead commentator Liam McLeod, Paul Mitchell, John Barnes, Kheredine Idessane, Al Lamont, Jane Lewis and Chris McLaughlin.

Previous lead commentators have been Archie MacPherson (1969–1990), Jock Brown (1990–1997), Rob MacLean (1997–2004) and
Paul Mitchell (2004–2010).

Reporters on Sportscene Results have included Jonathan Sutherland, Chris McLaughlin, Brian McLauchlin, Tam McManus, Kenny Crawford, Scott Davie, Martin Dowden, Jim Spence, Charlie Mann and Sandra Brown.

OnlineSportscene has begun simulcasting certain live matches via both the BBC Sport website and the BBC Sport Mobile app. The UEFA Cup tie between Molde and Rangers was one of the first to feature online. Most programmes now feature on the BBC iPlayer service, depending on rights restrictions.

In popular culture
The programme is regularly parodied in the Scottish football impressionist show Only an Excuse?. Munchtime Sportscene is a name often used by the programme's makers, presumably a play on the currently rested Lunchtime Sportscene programme.

See alsoSportsoundScotsport BBC Scotland BBC Sport''

References

External links

 

1975 Scottish television series debuts
1970s Scottish television series
BBC Scotland television shows
BBC Sport
British sports television series
Football mass media in Scotland
Sports television in Scotland
Scottish Premiership on television
1980s Scottish television series
1990s Scottish television series
2000s Scottish television series
2010s Scottish television series
2020s Scottish television series